Micropeza is a genus of stilt-legged flies  in the family Micropezidae.

Description
These stilt-legged flies have no crossvein separating discal cells and the second basal cell of the wing. Fronto‑orbital setaeare  absent. Costa is bare from base to end of subcostal vein.
Occiput is very prominent and has  postvertical bristles. The four posterior tibiae have small bristles.

Species
Species within this genus include:

 Micropeza abnormis
 Micropeza afghanistanica
 Micropeza albiseta
 Micropeza ambigua
 Micropeza angustipennis
 Micropeza annulata
 Micropeza annulipes
 Micropeza annuliventris
 Micropeza appendiculata
 Micropeza argentiniensis
 Micropeza armipennis
 Micropeza atra
 Micropeza atripes
 Micropeza atriseta
 Micropeza biannulata
 Micropeza bilineata
 Micropeza bisetosa
 Micropeza bogotana
 Micropeza brasiliensis
 Micropeza brevipennis
 Micropeza breviradialis
 Micropeza californica
 Micropeza chillcotti
 Micropeza cinerosa
 Micropeza cingulata
 Micropeza columbiana
 Micropeza compar
 Micropeza corrigiolata
 Micropeza distenta
 Micropeza distincta
 Micropeza divisa
 Micropeza dorsalis
 Micropeza flava
 Micropeza forficuloides
 Micropeza grallatrix
 Micropeza hispanica
 Micropeza incisa
 Micropeza kawalli
 Micropeza lateralis
 Micropeza lilloi
 Micropeza limbata
 Micropeza lineata
 Micropeza littoralis
 Micropeza luteiventris
 Micropeza maculiceps
 Micropeza maculidorsum
 Micropeza marginata
 Micropeza mongolica
 Micropeza nigra
 Micropeza nigricornis
 Micropeza nigrina
 Micropeza nitidicollis
 Micropeza nitidor
 Micropeza obscura
 Micropeza pallens
 Micropeza pectoralis
 Micropeza peruana
 Micropeza pilifemur
 Micropeza planula
 Micropeza producta
 Micropeza reconditus
 Micropeza recta
 Micropeza reuniens
 Micropeza ruficeps
 Micropeza sagittifer
 Micropeza setaventris
 Micropeza similis
 Micropeza simulans
 Micropeza soosi
 Micropeza stigmatica
 Micropeza subrecta
 Micropeza sufflava
 Micropeza tabernilla
 Micropeza tarsalis
 Micropeza texana
 Micropeza thoracicum
 Micropeza tibetana
 Micropeza triannulata
 Micropeza turcana
 Micropeza unca
 Micropeza ventralis
 Micropeza verticalis

References

Micropezidae
Nerioidea genera